Aşağı Qarxun (also, Ashaga Karkhun, Ashagy Karakhun, and Ashagy-Karkhun) is a village and municipality in the Yevlakh Rayon of Azerbaijan.  It has a population of 1,291.

References 

Populated places in Yevlakh District